The Mediterranean U-boat Campaign in the Mediterranean Sea was fought by Austria-Hungary and German Empire (with some support by the Ottoman Empire) against the Allies during World War I. It was characterised by the ability of the Central Powers to raid with near impunity during the first years of the war, causing substantial shipping losses, until the introduction of the convoy system allowed the Allies to drastically cut their losses from 1917 on.

History

1914: Initial stages 
At the outbreak of World War I, with Italy's decision to remain neutral, the naval strength of the Central Powers was represented by the navy of the Austro-Hungarian Empire, the KuK Kriegsmarine, whose only access to the sea was through the Adriatic coast. The Entente powers moved swiftly to blockade the Adriatic, sending a fleet to take station at the straits of Otranto.

The initial phase of the U-boat campaign in the Mediterranean comprised the actions by the KuK's U-boat force against the French. At the start of hostilities, the KuK had seven U-boats in commission; five operational, and two training; all were of the coastal type, with limited range and endurance, suitable for operation in the Adriatic.

Nevertheless, they had a number of successes. On 21 December 1914,  torpedoed the French battleship , Admiral Lapeyrere's flagship. She was saved from sinking, but was forced to retire with a damaged bow. This setback dissuaded the French capital ships from penetrating too far into the Adriatic. On 27 April 1915,  sank the French cruiser , with heavy loss of life.

But the KuK boats were unable to offer any interference to allied traffic in the Mediterranean beyond the Straits of Otranto.

1915

Operations at the Dardanelles 
In April 1915, the Imperial German Navy sent their first submarines to the Mediterranean in response to the Anglo-French Dardanelles campaign, after it became obvious that their Austro-Hungarian allies could do little against it with their small submarine force, which nevertheless was successful in defending the Adriatic.

In addition, the Germans dispatched a number of UB and UC type boats; these were sent in sections by rail to Pola where they were assembled for transit to Constantinople. One was lost, but by the end of 1915 the Germans had established a force of seven U-boats at Constantinople, misleadingly named the Mediterranean U-Boat Division.

Pola Flotilla 

At the same time, the Germans determined to establish a force in the Adriatic to open the commerce war against Allied trade in the Mediterranean.

By the end of June 1915, the Germans had assembled a further three pre-fabricated Type UB I submarines at Pola in Istria, two of them intended for transfer to the Austrian Navy. They were also assembling three Type UC I minelaying submarines, which were ordered converted into transports to carry small quantities of critical supplies to Turkey. However, the UB submarines were hindered by their short operational range and the Dardanelles currents, and in July U-21—the only U-boat with a decent operating range—was damaged by a mine and confined to Constantinople.

In August,  and  joined the German flotilla stationed at Cattaro, following pleas from the German military attaché in Constantinople, who reported that the Royal Navy's close naval support was inflicting heavy losses on Turkish forces at the Gallipoli beachheads.

War on commerce 
The Mediterranean was an attractive theatre of operations for the German Admiralstabs war on Allied commerce; a significant proportion of British imports passed through it, it was critical to French and Italian trade, and submarines would be able to operate effectively in it even in the northern-hemisphere autumn and winter, when poor weather hampered naval operations in the Atlantic and the North Sea. Additionally, there were certain choke points through which shipping had to pass, such as the Suez Canal, Malta, Crete, and Gibraltar. Finally, the Mediterranean offered the advantage that fewer neutral ships would be encountered, such as U.S. vessels, and fewer American citizens travelled the waters.

The German campaign in the Mediterranean is generally agreed to have properly begun in October 1915, when U-33 and U-39, followed later by U-35, were ordered to attack the approaches to Salonika and Kavalla. It was decided the same month that further reinforcements were called for, and a further large U-boat——sailed for Cattaro. Since Germany was not yet at war with Italy, even though Austria was, the German submarines were ordered to refrain from attacking Italian shipping in the eastern Mediterranean where the Italians might expect hostile action only from German submarines. When operating in the west, up to the line of Cape Matapan, the German U-boats flew the Austrian flag, and a sinking without warning policy was adopted, since large merchant ships could be attacked on the suspicion of being transports or auxiliary cruisers.

The German Admiralty also decided that the Type UB II submarines would be ideal for Mediterranean service. Since these were too large to be shipped in sections by rail to Pola like the Type UB I, the materials for their construction and German workers to assemble them were sent instead. The total in December fell to 17 ships which was still over ½ the total tonnage sunk in all theatres of operation at the time.

Ancona incident 
Ancona—bound from Messina to New York City—was fully booked and over 200 people were killed, including nine Americans.

In December 1915, Valentiner caused further outrage when he sank the passenger liner  without warning, with 343 killed.

In a further incident in March 1916, the German minelayer  was blown up by her own mines while laying a mine field off Taranto harbor. Italian divers inspected the wreck and established her identity. The knowledge that Germany—technically their ally—was assiduously mining their naval bases was a contributing factor in Italy's decision in May 1916 to declare war on Germany.

1916: Commerce war continues 
During 1916, the commerce war continued unabated. Allied countermeasures were largely ineffective; the complex arrangements for co-operation between the various navies meant a fragmented and unco-ordinated response, while the main remedy favoured by the Allies for the U-boat menace was to establish an anti-submarine barrier across the Straits of Otranto, the Otranto Barrage. This too was ineffective; the straits were too wide and deep for such a barrage to be successful, and consumed a huge effort and tied up many of the patrol vessels the Allies possessed. It also acted as a target for surface attacks, being the aim of a number of raids by KuK forces. Just two U-boats were caught in the barrage in all the time it was in operation; meanwhile the merchant ships continued to suffer huge losses.

Eight of the top twelve U-boat aces served in the Pola Flotilla, including the highest scoring commander of all, K/L Arnauld de la Perière.

1917: Unrestricted submarine warfare 
In January 1917, following the German decision to resume unrestricted submarine warfare, Foreign Secretary Arthur Zimmermann led a delegation to Vienna to secure the collaboration of Austria-Hungary. Grand Admiral Haus wholly supported the proposal, but Foreign Minister Count Ottokar Czernin had misgivings, as did the emperor, Charles I of Austria. Haus and the German delegates finally won the debate, partly by listing several instances where Allied submarines had sunk unarmed Austro-Hungarian ships in the Adriatic. The negotiations over the terms of the new Mediterranean submarine campaign were aided by the fact that Italy had declared war on Germany on 28 August 1916, making it no longer necessary for German U-boats to masquerade as Austrian vessels when attacking Italian shipping.

Shipping losses to U-boats reached a peak in April 1917, when the Central Powers had 28 boats operating, with as many as 10 at sea at any one time. While not a single submarine was sunk, they caused 94 ship losses in that one month, and severely endangered and delayed shipping. However, by that time, the Italian Navy had instituted convoy operations, with the British following on the Alexandria-Malta route in May 1917.

Japanese participation 
Beginning in April 1917, Japan, an ally of Great Britain, sent a total of 14 destroyers to the Mediterranean with cruiser flagships which were based at Malta and played an important part in escorting convoys to guard them against enemy submarines. The Japanese ships were very effective in patrol and anti-submarine activity. However, of the nine Austro-Hungarian navy submarines lost to enemy action, five were sunk by Italian navy units (U-13, U-10, U-16, U-20, and U-23), one by Italian and French units (U-30), one by Royal Navy units (U-3), while none were sunk by the Japanese navy, which lost one destroyer (torpedoed by U-27).

1918: Final stages 

Although convoys had been introduced between Malta and Alexandria in May 1917, the Allies were unable to introduce a comprehensive system until later in the year. The number of routes, and divided responsibilities, made this complicated, while a continued belief in offensive measures, such as the Otranto Barrage, kept up a shortage of escort ships elsewhere. Throughout the year U-boats were still able to find and sink ships sailing independently. By 1918, however, the U-boats' successes began to drop. In January 1918, German U-boats sank  and the Austrians sank a further  while two Pola boats were sunk.

Allied losses continued to fall during the year, while U-boat losses mounted. In May 1918, Allied losses dropped below  and did not rise above this again, while the Pola Flotilla lost four boats, its worst month of the war.

Karl Dönitz, who would go on to command the German U-boat force in World War II, was commander of UB-68, operating in the Mediterranean. On 4 October, this boat was sunk by British forces and Dönitz was taken prisoner on the island of Malta.

The Pola Flotilla had lost 11 boats, and the KuK a further 3. In October, the Central Powers were on the verge of collapse; Bulgaria and the Ottomans had sued for peace, and the Austrians were about to do the same. The Germans elected to abandon the Mediterranean; nine U-boats sailed from their bases on the Adriatic to return to Germany and a further ten boats were scuttled. Two ships—Mercia and Surada—were torpedoed on the way, the last Allied ships to be sunk in the Mediterranean, and three U-boats were attacked. U-35 was damaged and forced to run for Barcelona, where she was interned; U-34 was destroyed.

Bases and areas of operations 
Most of the German (and all of the Austro-Hungarian) U-boats operated out of the Adriatic, with their main base at Cattaro. Another German U-boat base was located at Constantinople in the Ottoman Empire. The U-boats also laid minefields, spread between such different locations like outside Toulon, France, to near Alexandria, Egypt.

Table

See also 
Adriatic Campaign of World War I
Gallipoli Campaign
U-boat Campaign (World War I)

Notes

References 

E Grey The Killing Time (1972) 
VE Tarrant The U-Boat offensive 1914–1945 (1989) 

Mediterranean naval operations of World War I
Military operations of World War I involving Austria-Hungary
Military operations of World War I involving Germany
U-boat Campaign (World War I)
Submarine warfare
U-boats